William Williams House

in the United States
(by state)
William Williams House (Lebanon, Connecticut), a National Historic Landmark and NRHP-listed
William Carlos Williams House, Rutherford, New Jersey, NRHP-listed
William G. and Anne Williams House, Sparta, Wisconsin, NRHP-listed

See also
Williams House (disambiguation)